Mărtiniș is a commune in Harghita, Romani.

Martiniș or Mărtiniș may also refer to:

People 
 Carla Martinis, Croatian operatic soprano
 John Martinis, American politician 
 John M. Martinis, American physicist and professor
 Susan A. Martinis, American biochemist

Music 
 The Martinis, American rock band

See also 
 Martini (disambiguation)